Mary Ellin Barrett ( Berlin; November 25, 1926 – July 16, 2022) was an American critic and memoirist, the eldest of three daughters of Ellin (née Mackay) and composer Irving Berlin.

Barrett was born and grew up in New York City, where she attended the Brearley School. She then went to Barnard College, majoring in music. After graduation, she began to work for Time Magazine, where she met her future husband, Marvin Barrett. She was the book critic for Cosmopolitan Magazine, where she worked very closely with Helen Gurley Brown.

Barrett was the author of three novels: Castle Ugly was published in 1966, followed by An Accident of Love in 1973 and American Beauty in 1981. Her last publication was a memoir entitled Irving Berlin: a Daughter's Memoir, which was released in May 1995.

Barrett resided in Manhattan, where she died on July 16, 2022, aged 95.

References

External links
Mary Ellin Barrett Interview NAMM Oral History Library (2011)

1926 births
2022 deaths
Place of birth missing
20th-century American memoirists
American people of Belarusian-Jewish descent
American women memoirists
American women novelists
20th-century American novelists
20th-century American women writers
Barnard College alumni
Brearley School alumni
Novelists from New York (state)